The 1956 Masters Tournament was the 20th Masters Tournament, held April 5–8 at Augusta National Golf Club in Augusta, Georgia.

Jack Burke Jr. won his first major championship and only Masters, one stroke ahead of amateur Ken Venturi. It was the final Masters played without a 36-hole cut.  CBS televised the third and fourth rounds of the tournament for the first time, and has done so every year since.

Burke shot a 71 (−1) on Sunday, one of only two players to break par in the final round; he rallied from a tournament record eight shots back to pass Venturi, who had led the entire tournament. Then a 24-year-old amateur, Venturi opened with a first round 66 (−6), the best round to date at the Masters by an amateur. But on Sunday, he shot a 42 (+6) on the final nine holes to card a disappointing 80 (+8). Burke's 289, along with Sam Snead in 1954 and Zach Johnson in 2007, remains the highest winning total in Masters history.

Burke was late arriving at the course for his final round on Sunday after going to church and had only fifteen minutes to warm up. He won a second (and final) major title in late July at the PGA Championship, in its penultimate edition as a match play competition.

Field
1. Masters champions
Jimmy Demaret, Claude Harmon, Ben Hogan (2,4,6,9,10), Cary Middlecoff (2,7,9,10,12), Byron Nelson (2,6,9), Henry Picard (6), Gene Sarazen (2,4,6), Horton Smith, Sam Snead (4,6,7,9,10), Craig Wood
Ralph Guldahl (2) and Herman Keiser did not play.

2. U.S. Open champions
Julius Boros (9,10), Billy Burke, Johnny Farrell, Jack Fleck (10), Ed Furgol (9), Lawson Little (3,5), Tony Manero, Lloyd Mangrum (9), Fred McLeod, Sam Parks Jr., George Sargent, Lew Worsham (12)

3. U.S. Amateur champions
Dick Chapman (5,a), Gene Littler (9,10), Billy Maxwell (9), Arnold Palmer (9,10), Skee Riegel (9), Sam Urzetta, Harvie Ward (5,8,9,10,11,a)

4. British Open champions
Jock Hutchison (6), Denny Shute (6)

5. British Amateur champions
Joe Conrad (8,9,a), Frank Stranahan (9,10)

6. PGA champions
Walter Burkemo (9), Doug Ford (7,10,12), Vic Ghezzi, Chick Harbert (7), Johnny Revolta, Jim Turnesa

7. Members of the U.S. 1955 Ryder Cup team
Jerry Barber, Tommy Bolt (9,10,12), Jack Burke Jr. (9,10,12), Ted Kroll

Marty Furgol and Chandler Harper (6) did not play.

8. Members of the U.S. 1955 Walker Cup team
Rex Baxter (a), William C. Campbell (a), Don Cherry (a), Bruce Cudd (a), Jimmy Jackson (a), Ed Meister (a), Dale Morey (a), Billy Joe Patton (a)

Dick Yost (a) did not play. Baxter and Meister were reserves for the team.

9. Top 24 players and ties from the 1955 Masters Tournament
Pete Cooper, Jay Hebert, Dick Mayer, Johnny Palmer, Bob Rosburg (10), Mike Souchak (10)

10. Top 24 players and ties from the 1955 U.S. Open
Bob Harris, Fred Hawkins (12), Bud Holscher, Walker Inman, Shelley Mayfield (12), Al Mengert, George Schneiter, Ernie Vossler, Art Wall Jr.

Smiley Quick did not play.

11. 1955 U.S. Amateur quarter-finalists
Bill Booe (a), Joe Campbell (a), Ed Hopkins (a), Bill Hyndman (a), Charles Kunkle (a), Jim McCoy (a), Hillman Robbins (9,a)

12. 1955 PGA Championship quarter-finalists
Don Fairfield

13. One player, either amateur or professional, not already qualified, selected by a ballot of ex-Masters champions
Ken Venturi (a)

14. One amateur, not already qualified, selected by a ballot of ex-U.S. Amateur champions
Don Bisplinghoff (a)

15. One professional, not already qualified, selected by a ballot of ex-U.S. Open champions
Fred Haas

16. Two players, not already qualified, from a points list based on finishes in the winter part of the 1956 PGA Tour
Dow Finsterwald, Lionel Hebert

17. Foreign invitations
Al Balding, Henry Cotton (4), Roberto De Vicenzo, Stan Leonard (9), Moe Norman (a)

Numbers in brackets indicate categories that the player would have qualified under had they been American.

Round summaries

First round
Thursday, April 5, 1956

Second round
Friday, April 6, 1956

Third round
Saturday, April 7, 1956

Final round
Sunday, April 8, 1956

Final leaderboard

Sources:

Scorecard

Cumulative tournament scores, relative to par
{|class="wikitable" span = 50 style="font-size:85%;
|-
|style="background: Red;" width=10|
|Eagle
|style="background: Pink;" width=10|
|Birdie
|style="background: PaleGreen;" width=10|
|Bogey
|style="background: Green;" width=10|
|Double bogey
|}
Source:

References

External links
Masters.com – Past winners and results
Augusta.com – 1956 Masters leaderboard and scorecards

1956
1956 in golf
1956 in American sports
1956 in sports in Georgia (U.S. state)
April 1956 sports events in the United States